Stephen John Baker (born 30 May 1946) was an Australian politician and 7th Deputy Premier of South Australia from 1993 to 1996. Baker represented the Liberal Party in the electoral district of Waite, formerly Mitcham in the House of Assembly.

Hailing from the moderate faction in his party, he won the seat of Mitcham at the 1982 state election from Democrat MP Heather Southcott, the only single-member lower house seat anywhere in Australia to be held by a Democrat. Baker became Deputy Premier and Treasurer in the government of fellow moderate Dean Brown after the 1993 state election, but was deposed as deputy leader in favour of Graham Ingerson when John Olsen was successful in a November 1996 leadership coup. Baker announced his retirement two months before the 1997 state election, which some interpreted as an act of revenge. The hastily conducted preselection resulted in a win for the conservative faction, whose candidate Martin Hamilton-Smith defeated moderate Robert Lawson, which prompted Brown to complain of interference by federal conservative MPs Nick Minchin, Grant Chapman and Andrew Southcott.

References

 

|-

|-

|-

1946 births
Living people
Liberal Party of Australia members of the Parliament of South Australia
Deputy Premiers of South Australia
Members of the South Australian House of Assembly
Treasurers of South Australia